The Ashit or Aşıt is a river in Tatarstan and Mari El, Russian Federation, a left-bank tributary of the Ilet.

Major tributaries are the Ura, Semit, Shashi, Urtemka, and Ilinka. Drainage is regulated. The lower part of the valley is swamped. The villages Alat and Bolshaya Atnya are in the river valley.

References 

Rivers of Tatarstan
Rivers of Mari El